Kevin Thomas Harris (20 February 1918 – 1984) was an Irish professional footballer who played in the Football League for Brentford as a wing half.

Personal life 
Harris served in the Irish Guards during the Second World War.

Career statistics

References

1918 births
Republic of Ireland association footballers
English Football League players
Brentford F.C. players
Association footballers from Dublin (city)
Association football wing halves
Association football inside forwards
Shamrock Rovers F.C. players
Notts County F.C. players
Irish expatriate sportspeople in England
Republic of Ireland expatriate association footballers
League of Ireland players
1984 deaths
Limerick F.C. players
British Army personnel of World War II
Irish Guards soldiers